"Slow Down Summer" is a song by American country music singer Thomas Rhett. It was released on November 5, 2021 as the lead single from his sixth studio album, Where We Started. The song was written by Rhett, Ashley Gorley, Sean Douglas, Jesse Frasure and Rhett Akins, and produced by Dann Huff and Frasure.

Background
In a press release, Rhett stated: "I wrote this song from the point of view of two people who are in love during senior year of high school, I envisioned them headed off to different schools and they're starting to understand that the moment the weather starts to change, they've got a 99-percent chance this relationship is not going to work. I know that myself and a lot of people have been there before, wishing the fireworks stage doesn't have to end."

Content
Carena Liptak of ABC Audio wrote that the lyrics "follow a couple who are soaking up every minute of their summer love together, knowing that when the weather cools, so will their relationship." Chris Parton of Sounds Like Nashville described the storyline as "two lovers locked in a summer they'll never forget—but knowing all too well their time together will soon end".

Composition
The song includes instrumentation from a 14-piece string section as well as a piano melody. It is written in the key of B major, with a tempo of 156 beats per minute.

Critical reception
Billy Dukes of Taste of Country opined that the track is "a nostalgic summer love song that stings just like it should".

Music video
The music video was released on December 3, 2021, and directed by P. Tracy. It described a story of "two young people holding on to the last moments of a summer together, as they prepare to embark on a new season apart". It features as Rhett plays the piano in different seasons.

Charts

Weekly charts

Year-end charts

Release history

References

2021 singles
2021 songs
Thomas Rhett songs
Songs written by Ashley Gorley
Songs written by Sean Douglas (songwriter)
Songs written by Jesse Frasure
Songs written by Rhett Akins
Songs written by Thomas Rhett
Song recordings produced by Dann Huff
Big Machine Records singles